The Bulgarian Chess Championship is an event inaugurated in 1933 to crown the best chess player in Bulgaria. The championship has been held on a nearly annual basis since, with only a few years missed. In recent years some of the very best Bulgarian players have not participated in the championship, including former World Champions Veselin Topalov and Antoaneta Stefanova.

Men's Championship
{| class="sortable wikitable"
! # !! Year !! City !! Men's Champion !! Comment
|-
| 1  || 1933 || Varna      ||  || Geshev defeated Yury Toshev (4.5 : 3.5) in a play-off match 
|-
| 2  || 1934 || Sofia      ||  ||
|-
| 3  || 1935 || Rousse     ||  ||
|-
| 4  || 1936 || Sofia      ||  ||
|-
| 5  || 1937 || Sofia      ||  ||
|-
| 6  || 1938 || Varna      ||  ||
|-
| 7  || 1940 || Sofia      ||    ||
|-
| 8  || 1942 || Sofia      ||  ||
|-
| 9  || 1943 || Sofia      ||  ||
|-
| 10 || 1945 || Sofia      ||  ||  won (off contest)  
|-
| 11 || 1946 || Sofia      ||  ||
|-
| 12 || 1947 || Sofia      ||   Yury Toshev ||
|-
| 13 || 1948 || Sofia      ||   Alexander Tsvetkov ||
|-
| 14 || 1949 || Sofia      ||  ||
|-
| 15 || 1950 || Sofia      ||  ||
|-
| 16 || 1951 || Sofia      ||       || Tsvetkov won ahead of Bobotsov and Minev in BUL-ch playoffs in January 1952
|-
| 17 || 1952 || Sofia      ||  ||
|-
| 18 || 1953 || Sofia      ||    ||
|-
| 19 || 1954 || Sofia      ||  ||
|-
| 20 || 1955 || Sofia      ||  ||
|-
| 21 || 1957 || Sofia      ||  ||
|-
| 22 || 1958 || Sofia      ||  ||
|-
| 23 || 1959 || Sofia      ||  ||
|-
| 24 || 1960 || Sofia      ||  ||
|-
| 25 || 1961 || Sofia      ||  ||
|-
| 26 || 1962 || Sofia      ||  ||
|-
| 27 || 1963 || Sofia      ||  ||
|-
| 28 || 1964 || Sofia      ||  || Padevsky defeated Atanas Kolarov (2.5 : 1.5) in a play-off match 
|-
| 29 || 1965 || Varna      ||  ||
|-
| 30 || 1966 || Sofia      ||  ||
|-
| 31 || 1968 || Sofia      ||  ||
|-
| 32 || 1969 || Plovdiv    ||  ||
|-
| 33 || 1970 || Sofia      ||  ||
|-
| 34 || 1971 || Sofia      ||  ||
|-
| 35 || 1972 || Sofia      ||  ||
|-
| 36 || 1973 || Sofia      ||  ||
|-
| 37 || 1973 || Sofia      ||  ||
|-
| 38 || 1974 || Asenovgrad ||  ||
|-
| 39 || 1975 || Pernik     ||  || Match-tournament: 1. Ermenkov 2. Nikola Spiridonov 3. Nikolai Radev
|-
| 40 || 1976 || Sofia      ||  ||
|-
| 41 || 1977 || Sofia      ||  ||
|-
| 42 || 1978 || Vratza     ||  ||
|-
| 43 || 1979 || Sofia      ||  || Ermenkov defeated Krum Georgiev in a play-off match
|-
| 44 || 1980 || Sofia      ||  || Radulov defeated Ventzislav Inkiov (2 : 1) in a play-off match
|-
| 45 || 1981 || Sofia      ||  ||
|-
| 46 || 1982 || Sofia      ||  || Inkiov defeated Valentin Lukov in a play-off match
|-
| 47 || 1983 || Pernik     ||  ||
|-
| 48 || 1984 || Sofia      ||  ||
|-
| 49 || 1985 || Sofia      ||  ||
|-
| 50 || 1986 || Sofia      ||  ||
|-
| 51 || 1987 || Elenite    ||  ||
|-
| 52 || 1988 || Sofia      ||  ||
|-
| 53 || 1989 || Sofia      ||  ||
|-
| 54 || 1990 || Sofia      ||  ||
|-
| 55 || 1991 || Pazardzhik ||  ||
|-
| 56 || 1992 || Bankya     ||  ||
|-
| 57 || 1993 || Pirdop     ||  ||
|-
| 58 || 1994 || Sofia      ||  ||
|-
| 59 || 1995 || Sofia      ||  ||
|-
| 60 || 1996 || Sofia      ||  ||
|-
| 61 || 1997 || Shumen    ||  ||
|-
| 62 || 1998 || Dupnitsa   ||  ||
|-
| 63 || 1999 || Plovdiv    ||  ||
|-
| 64 || 2000 || Asenovgrad ||  ||
|-
| 65 || 2001 || Tsarevo    ||  ||
|-
| 66 || 2002 || Sofia      ||  ||
|-
| 67 || 2003 || Sofia      ||  ||
|-
| 68 || 2004 || Sofia      ||  ||
|-
| 69 || 2005 || Pleven     ||  ||
|-
| 70 || 2006 || Svilengrad ||  ||
|-
| 71 || 2007 || Pernik     ||  ||
|-
| 72 || 2008 || Plovdiv     ||  ||
|-
| 73 || 2009 || Blagoevgrad     ||  ||
|-
| 74 || 2010 || Kiustendil     ||  ||
|-
| 75 || 2011 || Bankya     ||  ||
|-
| 76 || 2012 || Panagyurishte     || ||
|-
| 77 || 2013 || Bankya     || ||
|-
| 78 || 2014 || Kozloduy     ||||
|-
| 79 || 2015 || Pleven     ||||
|-
| 80 || 2016 || Pleven     ||||
|-
| 81 || 2017 || Montana     || ||
|-
| 82 || 2018 || Kozloduy     ||   ||
|-
| 83 || 2019 || Kozloduy     ||   ||
|-
| 84 || 2020 || Sofia     ||   ||
|}

Women's Championship

{| class="sortable wikitable"
! # !! Year !! City !! Women's Champion
|-
| 1  || 1951 || || 
|-
| 2  || 1952 || || 
|-
| 3  || 1953 || || 
|-
| 4  || 1954 || || 
|-
| 5  || 1955 || || 
|-
| 6  || 1956 || || 
|-
| 7  || 1957 || || 
|-
| 8  || 1958 || || 
|-
| 9  || 1960 || || 
|-
| 10  || 1961 || || 
|-
| 11  || 1962 || || 
|-
| 12  || 1963 || || 
|-
| 13  || 1964 || || 
|-
| 14  || 1965 || || 
|-
| 15  || 1966 || || 
|-
| 16  || 1967 || || 
|-
| 17  || 1968 || || 
|-
| 18  || 1969 || || 
|-
| 19  || 1970 || || 
|-
| 20  || 1971 || || 
|-
| 21  || 1972 || || 
|-
| 22  || 1973 || || 
|-
| 23  || 1974 || || 
|-
| 24  || 1975 || || 
|-
| 25  || 1976 || || 
|-
| 26  || 1977 || || 
|-
| 27  || 1978 || || 
|-
| 28  || 1979 || || 
|-
| 29  || 1980 || || 
|-
| 30  || 1981 || || 
|-
| 31  || 1982 || Sofia ||   
|-
| 32  || 1983 || || 
|-
| 33  || 1984 || ||   
|-
| 34  || 1985 || || 
|-
| 35  || 1986 || || 
|-
| 36  || 1987 || Sofia || 
|-
| 37  || 1988 || || 
|-
| 38  || 1989 || Sofia || 
|-
| 39  || 1990 || || 
|-
| 40  || 1991 || Bankya || 
|-
| 41  || 1992 || Pernik || 
|-
| 42  || 1993 || || 
|-
| 43  || 1994 || || 
|-
| 44  || 1995 || || 
|-
| 45  || 1996 || || 
|-
| 46  || 1997 || || 
|-
| 47  || 1998 || || 
|-
| 48  || 1999 || || 
|-
| 49  || 2000 || || 
|-
| 50  || 2001 || Plovdiv || 
|-
| 51  || 2002 || Plovdiv || 
|-
| 52  || 2003 || Sofia || 
|-
| 53  || 2004 || Sofia || 
|-
| 54  || 2005 || Veliko Tarnovo || 
|-
| 55  || 2006 || Svilengrad || 
|-
| 56  || 2007 || Pernik || 
|-
| 57  || 2008 || Plovdiv || 
|-
| 58  || 2009 || Dupnitsa || 
|-
| 59  || 2010 || Dupnitsa || 
|-
| 60  || 2011 || Bankya || 
|-
| 61  || 2012 || Panagyurishte || 
|-
| 62  || 2013 || Bankya || 
|-
| 63 || 2014 || Kozloduy     || 
|-
| 64 || 2015 || Pleven     || 
|-
| 65 || 2016 || Pleven     || 
|-
| 66 || 2017 || Pleven     || 
|-
| 67 || 2018 ||Chavdar||
|-
| 68 || 2019 ||Chavdar||
|-
| 69 || 2020 ||  Sofia || 
|}

References

 (results through 1985)

Chess national championships
Women's chess national championships
Chess in Bulgaria
1933 in chess
Recurring events established in 1933
Chess